Fountain City may refer to the following places in the U.S.:

Fountain City, Indiana
Fountain City, Knoxville, Tennessee
Fountain City, Wisconsin

See also
Fountain (disambiguation)#Places